United States Post Office is a historic post office building located at Wadesboro, Anson County, North Carolina.  It was designed by the Office of the Supervising Architect and built in 1932–1933. It is a two-story rectangular building of cream brick with limestone trim in a Classical / Colonial Revival style.  Five central bays of the front facade make up a slightly projecting frontispiece defined by an arcade of six colossal stone pilasters with Greek corinthian order capitals.

It was listed on the National Register of Historic Places in 1987. It is located in the Wadesboro Downtown Historic District.

References

Wadesboro
Neoclassical architecture in North Carolina
Colonial Revival architecture in North Carolina
Government buildings completed in 1933
Buildings and structures in Anson County, North Carolina
National Register of Historic Places in Anson County, North Carolina
Historic district contributing properties in North Carolina